Caledonian Railway 0-4-4T steam locomotives were built for the Caledonian Railway, in Scotland, over many years. Most survived into London, Midland and Scottish Railway (LMS) ownership in 1923 and some into British Railways (BR) ownership in 1948. Designers included Dugald Drummond, John Lambie, John F. McIntosh and William Pickersgill. A development of the Pickersgill design was introduced by the LMS in 1925.

Dugald Drummond
171 Class, 24 built 1884–1891
 LMS numbers 15100–15114 (all withdrawn by 1944)

John Lambie
19 Class, 10 built 1895
 CR numbers 19–28
 LMS numbers 15115–15124
 BR numbers 55119 and 55121–55124 (three had been withdrawn before 1948)

John F. McIntosh
92 Class, 12 built 1897
 CR numbers 13–18, 98–103 
 LMS numbers 15125–15136
 BR numbers 55125–55127, 55129, 55130, 55132–55136 (two withdrawn before 1948)

104 Balerno Class, 12 built 1899
 CR numbers 104–111, 167–170
 LMS numbers 15147–15158 (all withdrawn by 1938).

879 Class, 10 built 1900
 CR numbers 879–886, 437–438
 LMS numbers 15137–15146
 BR numbers 55138–55146 (55137 withdrawn before 1948)

439 Class, 68 built 1900–1914
 CR numbers 439–455, 151, 423, 473, 112, 125, 424, 463–466, 660, 666, 158, 419, 422, 429, 470, 126–127, 420–421, 427–428, 456, 467–469, 155, 160, 459, 461, 152–154, 156, 460, 462, 157, 164, 457–458, 228–231, 222–227.
 LMS numbers 15159–15226
 BR numbers 55159–55226

William Pickersgill
159 Class, 10 built 1915-1922
 CR numbers 159, 161–163, 418, 425–426, 430, 435–436
 LMS numbers 15227-15236
 BR numbers 55227-55236

431 Class, 4 built 1922
 CR numbers 431–434
 LMS numbers 15237–15240
 BR numbers 55237–55240

LMS locomotives
Class 2P, 10 built 1925
 LMS numbers 15260–15269
 BR numbers 55260–55269

Dimensions

Note
The weight figures differ by up to 3 cwt between sources. This may simply reflect the amount of fuel and water on board.

Condensing locomotives
The 19 and 92 Classes were originally fitted with condensing apparatus for use on Glasgow Central Low Level lines.

See also
 Caledonian Railway 439 Class
 Locomotives of the Caledonian Railway

References

 
 Ian Allan ABC of British Railways Locomotives, 1948, part 3, pp. 45–46
 Rail UK data page, 19 and 92 Classes
 Rail UK data page, 439 Class
 Rail UK data page, 431 Class
 Rail UK data page, LMS 2P Class

0-4-4T
0-4-4T locomotives
Condensing steam locomotives
Standard gauge steam locomotives of Great Britain